Georgian Public Broadcaster is the national public broadcaster of Georgia.

History

It started broadcasting radio in 1925, and Georgian TV started broadcasting in 1956. Today, 85% of the Georgian population receive the First Channel, and 55% receive the Second Channel. Georgian TV's programmes are also received by satellite and over the Internet in a number of European and Asian countries.

The adoption of Law on Broadcasting in 2004, started the process of transformation of Georgian TV from being a state broadcaster into a public broadcaster. In 2005 the Georgian Parliament elected a Board of Governors, composed of nine members. One of them, Tamar Kintsurashvili, from Liberty Institute, was later elected as the first Director General of GPB. Tinatin Berdzenishvili is the current occupant of this position.

Programming

Television
GPB's First Channel (პირველი არხი, p'irveli arkhi), also known as 1TV, broadcasts both its own original programming and also foreign series and movies. As of August 2009, the First Channel programming schedule includes such shows as the following:

 მოამბე moambe ("The Narrator") — a news program shown several times each day.
 პოლიტიკური კვირა p'olit'ik'uri k'vira ("Political Week") — a talk show interviewing public figures.
 პირველი თემა p'irveli tema ("First Theme") — a news analysis show.
 მე მიყვარს საქართველო me miq'vars sakartvelo ("I Love Georgia") — a game show dealing with Georgian culture.
 ცხოვრება მშვენიერია tskhovreba mshvenieria ("Life Is Beautiful") — a talk show.
 Syndicated foreign shows such as The O.C., Las Vegas, and Veronica Mars.

GPB's First Channel Education, previously Second Channel, broadcasts since 1963 and in its current educational format since 2020.

Previously, GPB operated the Russian-speaking channel Pyervy Caucasus Channel (Russian: Pyerviy Kafkazskiy, Первый Кавказский канал or just Первый Кавказский), which was broadcast between 2010 and 2012.

Radio
Georgian Radio – general-interest station broadcasting information and entertainment content. It also offers various programs for ethnic minorities in the country since 1925
Georgian Radio Music – thematic station with musical content and educational programs for older age groups with a focus on Georgian music since 1995

Georgian Public Broadcasting previously operated the now-closed international shortwave radio station Radio Georgia.

Controversies

A controversy arose in early 2009 over a GPB television program, Sakartvelos Didi Ateuli (საქართველოს დიდი ათეული; "Best Georgians" or "Georgia's Top Ten") — a show which invited viewers to pick Georgia's top historical personages. Officials of the Georgian Orthodox Church publicly objected to the inclusion of both religious and secular figures in the competition, as well as to the idea of having viewers rank the popularity of saints. After extensive public debate and private deliberation, GPB announced that Didi Ateuli would proceed, with both saints and secular figures retained in the competition, but that the final list of ten would not be ranked but would be announced in alphabetical order. A later statement released by the Georgian Orthodox Church attempted to downplay the controversy and suggested that it had been an effort to dissuade church officials from speaking out on social issues.

Georgia's entry in the 2009 Eurovision Song Contest – "We Don't Wanna Put In" – was deemed to be a political statement against Russian prime minister Vladimir Putin, and the song was disqualified from the competition. After GPB officials rejected a demand to change either the lyrics of the song or the song itself, it withdrew from the contest.

Notes

References

External links
 
 GPB First Channel

Mass media in Georgia (country)
Publicly funded broadcasters
European Broadcasting Union members
Radio stations established in 1925
Television channels and stations established in 1956
1925 establishments in Georgia (country)
State media